The 1991 Wichita State Shockers baseball team represented Wichita State University in the 1991 NCAA Division I baseball season. The Shockers played their home games at Eck Stadium in Wichita, Kansas. The team was coached by Gene Stephenson in his fourteenth season as head coach at Wichita State.

The Shockers reached the College World Series, finishing as the runner up to LSU.

Personnel

Roster

Coaches

Schedule

References 

Wichita State
Wichita State Shockers baseball seasons
College World Series seasons
Wichita State Baseball
Missouri Valley Conference baseball champion seasons
Wichita State